A gun registry is a government record of firearms and their owners. Not all jurisdictions require gun registration.

United States
In the United States, there is currently no national gun registry, but some states, such as Hawaii, have provided the federal government with information on gun owners. At the federal level, legislation has been introduced to criminalize creation of a gun registry.

Australia 
Under gun laws of Australia, a person is required to have a firearm licence to possess or use a firearm. Licence holders must demonstrate a "genuine reason" (which does not include self-defence) for holding a firearm licence and must not be a "prohibited person". All firearms must be registered by serial number to the owner, who must also hold a firearms licence.

See also
Canadian Firearms Registry

References

Firearm terminology